Georges Pootmans (19 May 1917 – 11 September 1976) was a Belgian ice hockey player. He competed in the men's tournament at the 1936 Winter Olympics.

References

External links
 

1917 births
1976 deaths
Olympic ice hockey players of Belgium
Ice hockey players at the 1936 Winter Olympics
Sportspeople from Regina, Saskatchewan